The Surreal Life: Fame Games is an American reality television series originally broadcast on the VH1 cable network. A spin-off of the VH1 show, The Surreal Life, the show assembled ten alumni of the show's six prior seasons to compete in a ten-week competition that takes place in Las Vegas, with the winner taking home a prize of $100,000 provided by the online gaming site Golden Palace.net. Robin Leach was the host. The contestants also competed in a game show format elimination round in each episode called "Back to Reality" that saw the losers, in the first three weeks of the competition, sent to "the B-List" which consisted of living in a less luxurious wing of the mansion than the rest of the housemates, who were designated as "the A-List". In the later weeks, when the teams were split evenly, they competed in team competitions where the losing team must send three members to play "Back to Reality" to eliminate one person from the competition entirely.

The show featured a theme song titled "I Wanna Be Famous" recorded by cast member C.C. Deville from his album Samantha 7.

Contestants

Game Summary

Legend

 The Fame Gamer won the Competition
 The Fame Gamer is in the B-list
 The Fame Gamer is in the A-list
 The Fame Gamer was Eliminated
 The Fame Gamer won the Reward Challenge
 The Fame Gamer was sent to "Back to Reality"
 The Fame Gamer quit the Competition

Notes
 In Episode 1, Jordan Knight went home due to the death of his grandmother and he was replaced by Verne Troyer.
 In Episode 6, the A-List and The B-list teams were no longer used and it became an individual competition.
 In Episode 7, the Fame Gamers who were in the bottom three are not sent to "Back to Reality", but instead, the person with the fewest points was instantly eliminated.

Episodes

References

External links
 
 Surreal Life Fame Games on AOL -- Weekly Coverage with Exclusive Robin Leach Interviews
 

2007 American television series debuts
2007 American television series endings
2000s American reality television series
VH1 original programming
The Surreal Life spinoffs
Television shows set in the Las Vegas Valley
English-language television shows
Vanilla Ice
Television series by Endemol
Television series by Lionsgate Television
American television spin-offs
Reality television spin-offs